SS Pedro Menendez was a Liberty ship built in the United States during World War II. She was named after Pedro Menendez.

Construction 
Pedro Menendez was laid down on 24 June 1944, under a Maritime Commission (MARCOM) contract, MC hull 2313, by J.A. Jones Construction, Panama City, Florida; and launched on 31 July 1944.

History
She was allocated to Moore-McCormack Lines, Inc., 18 August 1944. On 14 October 1946, she was laid up in the National Defense Reserve Fleet, in Mobile, Mobile.

On 23 February 1947, she was withdrawn from the fleet and allocated to Waterman Steamship Corporation. On 28 March 1947, she was allocated to Sword Line Inc. On 7 July 1948, she was allocated to the South Atlantic Steamship Line, for transfer to the Beaumont Reserve Fleet, in Beaumont, Texas. She was sold, 22 August 1966, for $45,600 to Southern Scrap Material Co., LTD, to be scrapped. She was withdrawn from the fleet on 25 October 1966.

References

Bibliography 

 
 
 
 

 

Liberty ships
Ships built in Panama City, Florida
1944 ships
Mobile Reserve Fleet
Beaumont Reserve Fleet